Jackie Rogers (born May 6, 1943 in Wilmington, North Carolina, USA) is a retired NASCAR Winston Cup Series driver who has led only six out of the 4943 laps that he raced in his entire career. Rogers earned $64,582 ($ when adjusted for inflation) and drove for  finishing an average of 21st place.

Rogers would benefit greatly from participating in the flat tracks; finishing an average of 16th place throughout his career. However, he would suffer from terrible performances on tri-oval intermediate tracks where a 24th-place finish was usually in the cards.

References

1943 births
Living people
NASCAR drivers
Sportspeople from Wilmington, North Carolina
Racing drivers from North Carolina